Chaim (Chajkel) Janowski (June 15, 1853 in Wołkowysk – 10 January 1935 in Tokyo) was a Polish chess master and organizer.

Born into a Jewish family in Wołkowysk (then Russian Empire), he was the younger brother of Dawid Janowski. He was educated in Łódź (then Congress Poland) where lived and played chess for many years. Chaim twice took fourth in 1897 and 1898 (Wiktor Abkin and Gersz Salwe won), won followed by Samuel Rosenblatt, W. Abkin, Mojżesz Grawe, in 1899/1900, and took 3rd, probably behind Salwe and Akiba Rubinstein, in 1904/1905.

He was one of the founders of Music Association "Hazomir" in Łódź in 1901. Chaim Janowski became the second (after a Russian colonel Konstanty Manakin) president of the Łódź Chess Club (Łódzkie Towarzystwo Zwolenników Gry Szachowej) in 1907-1912. In that time, he was an organiser of the fifth All-Russian Masters Tournament (1907/1908), and tournaments in which Frank James Marshall and Efim Bogoljubow participated.

After the First World War, he played in a team match Warsaw vs. Łódź (lost two games to Dawid Przepiórka) in 1922. Then, he went abroad and settled in Berlin. Later, together with his son, he moved to Japan. His wife, Hanna, a music school teacher, died in 1900 at the age of 26. He died in Tokyo and was buried in Yokohama, close to a small, local Jewish colony, in 1935. His son, Leon, became a professor of the Tokyo conservatoire.

References 

1867 births
1935 deaths
People from Vawkavysk
Belarusian Jews
Jewish chess players
Polish chess players
Belarusian chess players
Sportspeople from Łódź